The Condottieri class was a sequence of five different light cruiser classes of the Regia Marina (Italian Navy), although these classes show a clear line of evolution. They were built before World War II to gain predominance in the Mediterranean Sea. The ships were named after condottieri (military commanders) of Italian history.

Each class is known after the first ship of the group:

:
 
 
 
 

Cadorna class:
 
 

Montecuccoli class:
 
 

Duca d'Aosta class:
 
 

Luigi di Savoia Duca degli Abruzzi class:

Evolution
The first group, the four Giussanos, were built to counter the French large destroyers (contre-torpilleurs), the first being the 2,500 ton Le Fantasque-class, and therefore they featured very high speed, in exchange for virtually no armour protection. 

The following two Cadornas retained the main characteristics, with minor improvements to stability and hull strength.

Major changes were introduced for the next pair, the Montecuccolis. About 2,000 tons heavier, they had significantly better protection, and upgraded power-plants to maintain the required high speed. 

The two Duca d'Aostas continued the trend, thickening the armour and improving the power plant again.

The final pair, the Luigi di Savoia Duca degli Abruzzis completed the transition, sacrificing a little speed for good protection (their armour scheme was the same of the  heavy cruisers) and for two more 6-inch /55 guns.

Service
All ships served in the Mediterranean during World War II.

The subsequent vessels fared considerably better with all surviving the war, except  (torpedoed in August 1942 and sunk by an Allied bombing in December 1942).

Ships

Notes

References

External links

 Condottieri light cruiser classes

 

Cruiser classes
 
World War II cruisers of Italy
Cruisers of the Regia Marina
Cruisers of the Italian Navy